Sascha Reimann (born 2 October 1973 in Neuwied), better known by his stage name Ferris MC, is a German musician, rapper and actor.

Biography
Ferris spent his youth in Neumünster, Kiel, and then Bremen. A recurring theme of social exclusion is predominant in his music.

He graduated from Hauptschule and served his apprenticeship as an auto mechanic. At the same time, he was a radio DJ and actor (e.g. Tatort).

Together with Flowin Immo and DJ Pee, Ferris founded the Freaks Association Bremen (FAB), which, in the quickly-growing German hip hop scene, achieved success rather quickly. They performed at several events, festivals, and on MTV and VIVA.

In 1994, FAB released their first album Freaks, on the small indie label MZEE. Three years later, they disbanded over a private, professional dispute.

Ferris moved to Hamburg and in with Tobi Tobsen and finds DJ Stylewarz, who turned out to be a patient live DJ that was more fitting to Ferris' musical style. He released several records on Yo Mama.

In 1999, he released the single "Reimemonster" with fellow rapper Afrob, which was a success, and followed it with his first solo album Asimetrie. Later the same year he parted ways with Stylewarz, and wound up deeper in the Hamburg drug scene.

His second LP Fertich was released in 2001, but the single "Flash for Ferris MC" and the corresponding music video don't fulfill the high commercial expectations. In 2003, Ferris released a musical autobiography, adequately called Audiobiographie and his last regular album Ferris MC.

On 17 March 2006, his last single was released on the greatest hits album Düstere Legende'''. It concluded Ferris' career as a hip hop artist.

As Maniax, a house and electro project with Marc Deal, he plays in clubs in Germany, Austria, and Switzerland.

From 2008 to 2018, he was a member of the band Deichkind.

Discography
Albums
 1995 – Freaks (as FAB; MZEE)
 1999 – Asimetrie (Yo Mama)
 2001 – Fertich! (Yo Mama)
 2003 – Audiobiographie (Yo Mama)
 2004 – Ferris MC (Yo Mama)
 2006 – Düstere Legenden 2015 – Glück ohne Scherben 2017 – Asilant 2019 – Wahrscheinlich nie wieder vielleicht 2020 – Missglückte AsimetrieSingles
 1995 – "Freaks" (as FAB; 12", MZEE)
 1997 – "Es tut mir leid" (as FAB; 12")
 1997 – "ERiCH Privat" (FAB; EP)
 1999 – "Im Zeichen des Freaks"
 2000 – "Tanz mit mir"
 2001 – "Flash for Ferris MC"
 2002 – "Viel zu spät"
 2003 – "Zur Erinnerung"
 2003 – "Fiesta" (feat. Vanessa S.)
 2004 – "Feierarlarm"
 2004 – "Was wäre wenn?"
 2004 – "Spieglein, Spieglein"
 2004 – "Rappen und Feiern" (with JaOne & Twizzy)
 2005 – "Wixtape Vol.1 >> Der übliche Verdächtige"
 2005 – "Die Nacht der Freaks" (feat. Mellow Trax)
 2005 – "Achtung! Achtung!" (as Maniax; 12")
 2006 – "Düstere Legende (Achtung! Achtung!)" (also as DVD)
 2007 - Fuck the World (from Tube & Berger feat. Electro Ferris, 12″)
 2008 - Arbeit nervt (as member from Deichkind)
 2008 - Day Off (as Electro Ferris, 12″)
 2008 - 2 MC`S & 1 DJ (from DJ Stylewarz, Ferris MC and Toni-L, 12″)
 2008 - Dark City/Sex in the City (Maniax, 12″)
 2008 - Plutonium Boy (Maniax, 12″)
 2009 - Luftbahn (as member from Deichkind)
 2009 - Fight Club (als Electro Ferris, 12″)
 2009 - Fight Club Round 2 (ass Electro Ferris, 12″)
 2009 - Schattenwelt (as Electro Ferris mit Stereofunk)
 2010 - Sonnenlicht feat. Markus Lange & Denis Naidanow (als Electro Ferris)
 2011 - Stab (as Electro Ferris mit Nikolai)
 2011 - you got the Body Baby (as Electro Ferris mit Markus Lange)
 2012 - Bück dich hoch (as member from Deichkind)
 2012 - Leider geil (as member from Deichkind)
 2012 - Überfallkommando (as Ferris MC mit den Discodogs)
 2012 - Blood Red (as Ferris Hilton, 12″)
 2012 - Weltuntergang (feat. Swiss)
 2013 - Killah (as Ferris Hilton, 12″)
 2015 - All die schönen Dinge 2015 - Roter Teppich 2018 - Für Deutschland reichts 2019 - Phönix aus der Klapse'' (feat. Swiss, EP)
 2020 - Bullenwagen (feat. Shocky & Swiss + die Andern)
 2020 - Wir sterben alle
 2020 - Missglückte Asimetrie
 2020 - Kein Kompliment
 2020 - 13. Stock

References

External links

  Official website
  Ferris at laut.de
 

1973 births
Living people
German rappers
Hamburg hip hop
Musicians from Hamburg
German male actors
German DJs
Participants in the Bundesvision Song Contest
Electronic dance music DJs